Harvard station is a Metra commuter rail station in Harvard, Illinois. It is the terminus of the Union Pacific Northwest Line. The station contains a parking lot operated by the City of Harvard. A coach yard is adjacent to the station and is used to store trains during weekends and overnight hours. Harvard was the only Metra station located in the M zone, until all fare zones beyond J were retired by Metra in 2018. Trains that traveled to Chicago passed through an entire fare zone to reach . No stations were located in zone L. Originally, Hartland was the only station located in zone L, however, the stop was closed in 1984. Harvard is the last station to use more than one track, as further beyond this station, the UP line is single tracked until reaching Janesville, Wisconsin.

Being Chicago's most northwesterly commuter rail station, the Harvard station attracts commuters from the Rockford and Belvidere region of northern Illinois as well as south-central Wisconsin. , Harvard is the 151st busiest of the 236 non-downtown stations in the Metra system, with an average of 265 weekday boardings.

As of April 25, 2022, Harvard is served by 23 trains (11 inbound, 12 outbound) on weekdays, by 20 trains (10 in each direction) on Saturdays, and by 15 trains (seven inbound, eight outbound) on Sundays.

Bus connections
Pace

808 Crystal Lake/Harvard

References

External links

Metra - Harvard Station
Station from Ayer Street from Google Maps Street View

Metra stations in Illinois
Former Chicago and North Western Railway stations
Harvard, Illinois
Railway stations in the United States opened in 1993
Railway stations in McHenry County, Illinois